Knight Frank LLP is an estate agency, residential and commercial property consultancy founded in London by John Knight, Howard Frank and William Rutley in 1896. Knight Frank together with its American affiliate Cresa is one of the world's largest global property consultancies.

Headquartered in London, England, Knight Frank's global network have more than 488 offices across 57 territories and more than 20,000 people handle in excess of US$817 billion (£498 billion) worth of commercial, agricultural and residential real estate annually.

History

Knight, Frank & Rutley is an earlier name of the firm. Sir Howard George Frank, 1st Baronet was an English estate agent, head of the firms of Knight, Frank & Rutley of London and Walton & Lee of Edinburgh and was president of the Estate Agents' Institute from 1912 to 1914.

1897: The first recorded business property sale is achieved in November, when Knight, Frank & Rutley sells a ‘cycle machinery and plant’ business in Battersea for £270 11s 6d.

1911: The Crystal Palace is sold to Lord Plymouth for £210,000.

1914: Howard Frank, the senior partner, is knighted.

1915: Cecil Chubb buys Stonehenge through Knight, Frank & Rutley for £6,600 as a present for his wife Alice. Mr & Mrs Chubb gave it "to the Nation" three years later.

1921: The town of Reigate is sold by Knight, Frank & Rutley for £203,840 – the first time the firm has disposed of an entire town.

1922: The firm handles the sale of Winston Churchill's house and sells Chartwell to him.

1924: The Duke of Westminster sells Grosvenor House in Park Lane through Knight, Frank & Rutley.

1927: The firm advises on the site assembly for the BBC's headquarters, Broadcasting House in London. 

1937: Most of the town of Lytham St Annes in Lancashire is sold – including the celebrated golf course.

1974: Fountains Abbey, Yorkshire, dating back to 1132, is sold for £1 million.

1981: In New York, Douglas Elliman Knight Frank sells Pan-American World Airways Intercontinental Hotels Corporation to Grand Metropolitan for $500 million.

1996: On 1 January, ‘Rutley’ is dropped from the Knight Frank name as part of a plan to expand international market share.

2000: Knight Frank sells the Duke of York's Headquarters in Chelsea, London, on behalf of the Ministry of Defence.

2005: The firm is appointed to advise on the development of the London Olympic Village for the 2012 Summer Olympics.

2006: With effect from 1 January, Knight Frank establishes a global real estate partnership with leading New York-based real estate service firm Newmark Knight Frank, formerly Newmark.

2012: February, presents Battersea Power Station to the global property market.

2013: Participated in the founding of OnTheMarket

2015: Knight Frank wins the instruction to sell 231 prime residential units within the Royal Atlantis on the Palm Jumeirah, Dubai.

Indexes and reports

Global House Price Index
The Knight Frank Global House Price Index is compiled using official government statistical office or central bank data where possible.

House Price Sentiment Index (HPSI)
The Knight Frank/Markit House Price Sentiment Index (HPSI) provides the earliest view of how the UK housing market is faring. The monthly survey gauges the sentiment of households across the country, and is a lead indicator of future house price movement.

Country House Index
The Knight Frank Country House Index is a valuation based index, compiled quarterly from valuations prepared by professional valuers in every Knight Frank Country House office in the UK. The index is based on the valuation of a comprehensive basket of properties throughout all United Kingdom regions based on actual sales evidence.

Prime Central London Index
The Knight Frank Prime Central London Index, established in 1976, covers the prime central London residential marketplace. The index is based on a repeat valuation methodology that tracks capital values of prime central London residential property.

The Wealth Report
The Wealth Report is an annual publication produced by Knight Frank. The Wealth Report looks at global prime property trends and wealth, and examines the prime and super-prime property markets. The Wealth Report focuses heavily on the investment activity of global single and multi family offices. In their latest report of 2018, the Knight Frank Wealth Report expounded on the increase in family office real estate activity, citing both WeWork and the FINTRX Family Office Platform. The report stated that 57% of North American family offices had real estate exposure, while 48% European family offices were currently allocated to the real estate sector.

References

External links

Real estate companies established in 1896
1896 establishments in England
Property companies based in London
Property services companies of the United Kingdom